Palaeontinidae, commonly known as giant cicadas, is an extinct family of cicadomorphs. They existed from the Late Triassic to the Early Cretaceous. The family contains around 30 to 40 genera and around a hundred species.

Discovery
The first palaeontinid discovered was Palaeontina oolitica. It consisted of a single forewing collected from the Taynton Limestone Formation (Stonesfield Slate) of Oxfordshire, England by the English natural historian Edward Charlesworth. It was first described in 1873 by the English entomologist Arthur Gardiner Butler in his book Lepidoptera Exotica; or, Descriptions and Illustrations of Exotic Lepidoptera. Butler claimed that it was the oldest butterfly ever recovered, having mistakenly identified it as a butterfly of the family Nymphalidae.

Description and paleobiology
Palaeontinids had large bodies covered with bristles (setae). They had small heads and broad wings. They superficially resemble moths.
They possessed an inflated frons and a long rostrum (piercing and sucking mouthpart),  indicating that they fed on xylem fluids like some other modern hemipterans.

Some authors have proposed that the host plants of palaeontinids to be ginkgophytes based on the geographic distribution of both groups, however other authors have argued that this association is likely to be spurious, given that that paleontinids also occur in areas with no ginkgophytes. Some authors have suggested that the decline of gymnosperms and the rise of angiosperms (flowering plants) during the Cretaceous could have been a factor in their extinction. Numerous newly evolved insectivorous animals (feathered theropods, primitive mammals, and early birds) may have also contributed significantly to their extinction.

Most species of palaeontinids exhibit cryptic coloration. The patterns on their wings protected them as they perched on branches and fed on sap. They may also have served as secondary sexual characteristics. The color patterns can vary slightly within the same species.

Palaeontinids, like modern cicadas, possess four membranous wings supported by veins. The length and width ratio of the wings can vary within the same species, sometimes as a result of fossil preservation. Early Jurassic palaeontinids, like Suljuktocossus, exhibit the most primitive wing forms in the family. The forewing was elliptical with the "nodal line" (the area where the wing bends during flight, also known as the "transverse flexion line") more or less dissecting through the center of the wing. The hindwing was short and broad. The bases of the forewings overlapped that of the hindwings like in modern butterflies. Taken together with their large bodies, these characteristics indicate that they were fast but moderately versatile fliers.

In contrast, later palaeontinids like the Upper Jurassic Eocicada and Early Cretaceous Ilerdocossus had triangular forewings with the flexion line closer to the base. They had smaller and narrower hindwings that did not overlap with the forewing. These indicate that they were highly versatile fliers, able to fly with a wide range of speeds and agility like modern wasps and sphinx moths. They also possessed changes to the leading edge of their forewings, suggesting an overall gain in lift.

The trend of forewing elongation is most evident in members of the family Mesogereonidae, an early offshoot and close relatives of palaeontinids.

Classification

The family was first erected by the Austrian entomologist  Anton Handlirsch in 1908. Like Butler, Handlirsch insisted that palaeontinids were members of lepidopteran Heteroneura (butterflies and moths). Palaeontinids were then only known mostly from poorly preserved specimens like Palaeontina and Eocicada. He claimed they were related to the extant family Limacodidae (slug moths). The English entomologist Edward Meyrick supported the lepidopteran conclusion, though he believed they belonged to the family Hepialidae (ghost moths) instead. He said "There is little doubt that it [i.e. Palaeontina oolitica] belongs to the Hepialidae."

The Belgian entomologist Auguste Lameere challenged this conclusion, claiming palaeontinids were more closely related to the extant family Cicadidae (cicadas). The English-Australian entomologist and geologist Robert John Tillyard supported Lameere's conclusion, noting that the wings of palaeontinid fossils lacked the characteristic scales of lepidopterans but instead had tubercules, pits, and cross-ridges like those found in modern cicadas. He also cited characteristics of wing venation that distinctly differs from that of lepidopterans.

Palaeontinidae are currently classified under the extinct superfamily Palaeontinoidea along with the families Dunstaniidae and Mesogereonidae. They are classified under infraorder Cicadomorpha of the hemipterans (true bugs).

The name Cicadomorphidae was once proposed as a replacement for the name Palaeontinidae in 1956 by the Australian entomologist J.W. Evans. This was because of Handlirsch's earlier insistence that the type species Palaeontina oolitica may not have been Hemipteran. However, Evans later conceded that retaining the name Palaeontinidae was preferable as the drawings Handlirsch based his conclusions on were from badly preserved specimens.

Evolution
Riek (1976) originally considered Palaeontinoidea to be the descendants of the family Cicadoprosbolidae (currently known as the family Tettigarctidae), insects believed to be transitional between the ancestral cicada-like family Prosbolidae and the modern family Cicadidae.

Wang et al (2009), however, notes that palaeontinoids more closely resemble prosbolids in agreement with earlier studies by Wootton (1971), Shcherbakov (1984), and Shcherbakov and Popov (2002). They conclude that palaeontinoids descended directly from the family Prosbolidae rather than from tettigarctids. Modern cicadas therefore, did not descend directly from Palaeontinidae.

Within Palaeontinoidea, the family Dunstaniidae (Upper Permian to Lower Jurassic of Australia, South Africa, and China) is ancestral to palaeontinids. Both are distinct from the only other member of the superfamily, the more primitive and specialized family Mesogereonidae (Upper Triassic of Australia and South Africa).

Distribution and geologic time range

The oldest known member of the group is Hallakkungis from South Korea dating to the Norian stage of the Late Triassic (ca. 227 – ca. 208.5 Mya) and the youngest members are from the late Aptian age of the Lower Cretaceous (~115-113 Mya). They achieved their greatest diversity during the Jurassic period.

Palaeontinid fossils are abundant in Eurasia and South America. Fossils have been recorded in Brazil, China, Russia, Germany, the Transbaikal region, Tajikistan, Turkmenistan, Kyrgyzstan, Kazakhstan, Spain, and the United Kingdom. Important localities for palaeontinid fossils include the Crato Formation Lagerstätte of Brazil and the Yixian Formation, Haifanggou (or Jiulongshan) Formation, and the Daohugou Beds of China.

Genera
The following is the list of genera classified under Palaeontinidae:

Abrocossus Wang & Zhang, 2007 in Wang et al. 2007a - Daohugou Beds, Middle Jurassic, East Asia
Archipsyche Handlirsch, 1906–1908 - Solnhofen Formation Late Jurassic, Central Europe
Asiocossus Becker-Migdisova, 1962 - Dzhil Formation, Early Jurassic, Central Asia
Baeocossus Menon et al. 2005 - Crato Formation Early Cretaceous, Eastern South America
Cicadomorpha Martynov, 1926 - Karabastau Formation, Late Jurassic, Central Asia; Glushkovo Formation, Ukurei Formation, Late Jurassic North Asia
Colossocossus Menon et al. 2005 - Crato Formation, Early Cretaceous, Eastern South America
Cratocossus Martins-Neto, 1998 - Crato Formation, Early Cretaceous, Eastern South America
Daohugoucossus Wang et al. 2006b - Daohugou, Middle Jurassic, East Asia
Eocicada Oppenheim, 1888 - Solnhofen Formation, Late Jurassic, Central Europe
Eoiocossus Wang et al. 2006c in Wang et al. 2006c - (includes Papilioncossus Wang et al. 2007c) Daohugou Middle Jurassic, East Asia
Gansucossus Wang et al. 2006b - Dashankou Formation, Jiulongshan Formation, Daohugou  Middle Jurassic, East Asia
Hallakkungis  Nam, Wang, & Szwedo, 2017 - Amisan Formation Upper Triassic, South Korea
Hamicossus Wang & Ren 2007ab - Daohugou Middle Jurassic, East Asia
Ilerdocossus Gomez-Pallerola, 1984 - (includes Wonnacottella Whalley & Jarzembowski, 1985 and Liaocossus Ren et al., 1998) La Pedrera de Rúbies Formation, Weald Clay, Yixian Formation  Early Cretaceous, Western Europe & East Asia
Limacodites Handlirsch, 1906–1908 - Solnhofen Formation, Late Jurassic, Central Europe
Martynovocossus Wang & Zhang 2008 in Wang et al. 2008 - (= Pseudocossus Martynov, 1931) Badaowan Formation, Daohugou, Kushmurun Formation, Cheremkhovskaya Formation,  Early to Middle Jurassic, North Asia; Late Jurassic, Central Asia
Miracossus Ren et al. 1998 - Yixian Formation, Early Cretaceous, East Asia
Montsecocossus Gomez-Pallerola, 1984 - La Pedrera de Rúbies Formation Early Cretaceous, Western Europe
Neimenggucossus Wang & Zhang, 2007 in Wang et al. 2007a - Daohugou, Middle Jurassic, East Asia
Ningchengia Wang, Zhang & Szwedo, 2009 - (= Fletcheriana Evans, 1956 in partim) Daohugou Middle Jurassic, East Asia
Pachypsyche Handlirsch 1906 - La Pedrera de Rúbies Formation  Early Cretaceous, Western Europe
Palaeocossus Oppenheim, 1885 - Sagul Formation, Cheremkhovskaya Formation Early Jurassic, Central and North Asia
Palaeontina Butler, 1873 - Taynton Limestone Formation Middle Jurassic, Western Europe
Palaeontinodes Martynov, 1937 - (= Ijacossus Becker-Migdisova, 1950; Shcherbakov 1985) Sulyukta Formation, Sagul Formation, Haifanggou Formation, Cheremkhovskaya Formation, Early to Middle Jurassic, Central and North Asia; Middle Jurassic, Central Asia
Parawonnacottella Ueda, 1997 - Crato Formation, Early Cretaceous, Eastern South America
Phragmatoecicossus Becker-Migdisova, 1949 - Sagul Formation, Early to Middle Jurassic, Central Asia
Phragmatoecites Oppenheim, 1885 - Cheremkhovskaya Formation, Early to Middle Jurassic, North Asia
Plachutella Becker-Migdisova, 1949 - Badaowan Formation, Jiulongshan Formation, Daohugou, Karabastau Formation, Sagul Formation, Cheremkhovskaya Formation, Early to Late Jurassic, Central and Eastern Asia
Prolystra Oppenheim, 1888 syn Beloptesis - Solnhofen Formation, Late Jurassic, Central Europe
Protopsyche Handlirsch, 1906–1908 - Solnhofen Formation, Late Jurassic, Central Europe
Shurabocossus Becker-Migdisova, 1949 - Sagul Formation, Early to Middle Jurassic, Central Asia
Sinopalaeocossus Hong, 1983- (= Quadraticossus Wang & Ren, 2007a) Daohugou, Haifanggou Formation, Middle Jurassic, East Asia
Suljuktaja Becker-Migdisova, 1949 - Sulyukta Formation, Early to Middle Jurassic, Central Asia
Suljuktocossus Becker-Migdisova, 1949 - (= Fletcheriana Evans, 1956 in partim) Sulyukta Formation, Early Jurassic, Central Asia; Daohugou Middle Jurassic, North Asia
†Synapocossus Wang et al. 2013 Daohugou Middle Jurassic, East Asia
†Talbragarocossus Chen et al. 2019 Talbragar Fossil Fish Bed, Australia, Late Jurassic
Turgaiella Becker-Migdisova & Wootton, 1965 - Kushmurun Formation, Jurassic, Central Asia
Valdicossus Wang, Zhang & Jarzembowski 2008 - Weald Clay, Early Cretaceous, Western Europe
Yanocossus Ren, 1995 - Yixian Formation, Early Cretaceous, East Asia
Cyllonium Westwood, 1854 - Early Cretaceous, Western Europe (too poorly preserved)
Palaeontinopsis Martynov, 1937 - Early Jurassic, Central Asia (nomen dubium)
Palaeontinopsis sinensis - Hong, 1986; Zhang, 1997 Middle Jurassic, East Asia
Fletcheriana jurassica - Zhang, 1997
Fletcheriana magna - Riek, 1976

See also

Prehistoric Lepidoptera
Prehistoric insects

References

External links

Extinct Hemiptera
Triassic insects
Jurassic insects
Cretaceous insects
Prehistoric insect families
Rhaetian first appearances
Aptian extinctions
Taxa named by Anton Handlirsch